Players and pairs who neither have high enough rankings nor receive wild cards may participate in a qualifying tournament held one week before the annual Wimbledon Tennis Championships.

Seeds

  Dustin Brown /  Rameez Junaid (qualifying competition, Lucky losers)
  Sam Groth /  Chris Guccione (qualified)
  Dominik Meffert /  Philipp Oswald (qualified)
  Purav Raja /  Divij Sharan (qualified)
  Colin Ebelthite /  Adil Shamasdin (first round)
  Brydan Klein /  Dane Propoggia (first round)
  Steve Johnson /  Andreas Siljeström (qualifying competition, Lucky losers)
  Jesse Levine /  Vasek Pospisil (qualified)

Qualifiers

  Jesse Levine /  Vasek Pospisil
  Sam Groth /  Chris Guccione
  Dominik Meffert /  Philipp Oswald
  Purav Raja /  Divij Sharan

Lucky losers

  Dustin Brown /  Rameez Junaid
  Steve Johnson /  Andreas Siljeström
  Denis Kudla /  Tim Smyczek

Qualifying draw

First qualifier

Second qualifier

Third qualifier

Fourth qualifier

External links

2013 Wimbledon Championships – Men's draws and results at the International Tennis Federation

Men's Doubles Qualifying
Wimbledon Championship by year – Men's doubles qualifying